Face to Face is the second studio album by Australian hard rock band, the Angels, which was released in June 1978. It was co-produced by the band with Mark Opitz, which peaked at No. 18 on the Kent Music Report Albums Chart. For shipment of 280,000 copies, it was accredited as 4× platinum.

The international version was released in March 1980 under the band name, Angel City, as a compilation of tracks from both the Australian version of Face to Face and from their third studio album, No Exit (June 1979). It also included a re-recorded version of "Am I Ever Gonna See Your Face Again", which had been issued as their debut single in March 1976 from their first album, The Angels.

The album cover was designed by Peter Ledger and won the King of Pop award for 'Best Album Cover Design' in 1978. In October 2010, Face to Face was listed in the book, 100 Best Australian Albums. The international version of album was reissued on CD by Rock Candy Records in 2011.

Reception 

Australian musicologist, Ian McFarlane, described Face to Face as a "watershed" release for both the group and Mark Opitz. Ed Nimmervoll of Howlspace website opined that it "delivered a tough blend of punk and metal. The band brought it home on stage behind their theatrical lead singer, jumping and gesturing maniacally, highlighting the drama in the lyrics. In every way they were one of the most exciting bands in the country, and exhaustive touring brought the band a generation of loyal fans." John Floyd of AllMusic rated the international version at three out of five stars and declared, "This roaring Australian combo displays their AC/DC-cum-punk hearts on a powerful US debut." Canadian journalist Martin Popoff described the band as "a more new-wavey, more intelligent and busier version" of AC/DC and praised the 1980's version of the album for being "a solid barroom collection of unassuming yet infectious roots rockers, riding the line between stiff hard rock and base metal".

Track listings
Credits adapted from the original LP releases.

1978 Australian version

1980 International version

Personnel
Doc Neeson – lead vocals
Richard Brewster – lead guitar    
John Brewster – rhythm guitar
Chris Bailey – bass guitar
Graham "Buzz" Bidstrup – drums

Production
 Producer – The Angels, Mark Opitz
 Cover artwork – Peter Ledger

Charts

Certifications

References

		

1978 albums
The Angels (Australian band) albums
Albums produced by Mark Opitz
Albert Productions albums